Milnthorpe railway station served the village of Milnthorpe, in the historical county of Westmorland, England, from 1846 to 1968 on the Lancaster and Carlisle Railway.

History 
The station was opened on 22 August 1846 by the Lancaster and Carlisle Railway. It closed on 1 July 1968.

References 

Disused railway stations in Cumbria
Former Lancaster and Carlisle Railway stations
Railway stations in Great Britain opened in 1846
Railway stations in Great Britain closed in 1968
1846 establishments in England
1968 disestablishments in England